Edupunk is a do it yourself (DIY) attitude to teaching and learning practices.  Tom Kuntz described edupunk as "an approach to teaching that avoids mainstream tools like PowerPoint and Blackboard, and instead aims to bring the rebellious attitude and DIY ethos of ’70s bands like The Clash to the classroom." Many instructional applications can be described as DIY education or edupunk.

The term was first used on May 25, 2008, by Jim Groom in his blog, and covered less than a week later in the Chronicle of Higher Education. Stephen Downes, an online education theorist and an editor for the International Journal of Instructional Technology and Distance Learning, noted that "the concept of edupunk has totally caught wind, spreading through the blogosphere like wildfire".

Aspects
Edupunk has risen from an objection to the efforts of government and corporate interests in reframing and bundling emerging technologies into cookie-cutter products with pre-defined application—somewhat similar to traditional punk ideologies.

The reaction to corporate influence on education is only one part of edupunk, though. Stephen Downes has identified three aspects to this approach:
 Reaction against commercialization of learning
 Do-it-yourself attitude
 Thinking and learning for yourself

Examples
An example of edupunk was the University of British Columbia's course "Wikipedia:WikiProject Murder Madness and Mayhem" experiment of creating articles on Wikipedia in spring 2008, "(having) one’s students as partners and peers." A video clip illustrating an edupunk approach, produced by Tony Hirst at the Open University in the UK, on 8 June 2008, illustrated how quickly the edupunk concept has been adopted outside North America.
A website set up by Australian educators illustrates how edupunk spread, and a presentation by Norm Friesen of Thompson Rivers University identifies a number of possible intellectual precursors for the movement.

Hampshire College, Evergreen State College, Marlboro College, New College of Florida, and Warren Wilson College are collegiate institutions imbued with edupunk ideology.

See also
 Democratic education
 Self-directed learning
 Student-centered education
 Unschooling
 Anarchistic free school
 Critical pedagogy
 Autodidacticism
 Massive Open Online Courses (MOOCs)

Notes

References
.
.
.

External links

Academic terminology
Alternative education
DIY culture
Education theory